Gordon John Brand (6 August 1955 – 11 August 2020) was an English professional golfer.

Career
Brand turned professional in 1976 and enjoyed full playing privileges on the European Tour for 20 years. During his time on tour, he finished inside the top 30 on the Order of Merit seven times and inside the top 100 16 times. His highest ranking came in 1986, fifth place, in which year he finished as runner-up to Greg Norman in The Open Championship at Turnberry. Brand is also remembered for recording a hole in one at the 16th hole during the 1981 Open Championship at Royal St George's Golf Club. In that year he won the Tooting Bec Cup after posting a round of 65. Brand repeated this feat again in 1986 on his way to finishing runner-up.

Brand won his sole European Tour event in 1989, taking the Belgian Open at Royal Waterloo Golf Club, Brussels, by four shots. He was also very successful in Africa with seven tournament victories on the continent, notably winning the Open de Côte d'Ivoire no fewer than three times. He was a winner of the Safari Circuit order of merit on three occasions.

Brand played in the 1983 Ryder Cup, represented England at the World Cup and was part of the 1986 and winning 1987 Dunhill Cup teams. Brand's win against Sam Torrance helped, alongside Nick Faldo and Howard Clark beat Scotland on the final day to secure the title.

After a successful golfing career, Brand went on to work for the European Tour as a tournament referee before quitting in 2005 to play on the European Senior Tour. Brand had five victories on the European Senior Tour to his name, the most memorable coming at the 2008 PGA Seniors Championship. After a 72-hole score of 4-over par, Brand and Gordon Brand Jnr of Scotland played a record-equalling six hole playoff, with Gordon J. Brand winning the sixth extra hole with a par putt on the par 3 17th after playing the 18th hole five times. After his win, Brand credited his wife Lyn, a former Ladies European Tour player for a putting tip suggested to him before the final round. A week later, Brand also won the Travis Perkins Senior Masters at Woburn Golf Club. With that win, Brand finished a senior career-best second on the Order of Merit behind former Masters champion Ian Woosnam. After finishing second on the Order of Merit in 2008, Brand struggled for form finishing 21st and 15th in the 2009 and 2010 Order of Merits respectively, posting only five top 10 finishes.

Brand died on 11 August 2020 at the age of 65, following a short illness.

Gordon J. Brand should not be confused with his Scottish contemporary Gordon Brand Jnr.

Professional wins (14)

European Tour wins (1)

Safari Circuit wins (7)

Other wins (1)
1988 Leeds Cup

European Senior Tour wins (5)

European Senior Tour playoff record (2–0)

Results in major championships

CUT = missed the half-way cut (3rd round cut in 1979, 1982, 1983 and 1984 Open Championships)
"T" indicates a tie for a place
Note: Brand never played in the Masters Tournament or the PGA Championship.

Results in senior major championships
Results not in chronological order before 2016.

CUT = missed the halfway cut
"T" indicates a tie for a place
Note: Brand never played in The Tradition or the Senior Players Championship.

Team appearances
Ryder Cup (representing Europe): 1983
World Cup (representing England): 1983
Dunhill Cup (representing England): 1986, 1987 (winners)
Nissan Cup (representing Europe): 1986

References

External links

English male golfers
European Tour golfers
European Senior Tour golfers
Ryder Cup competitors for Europe
Sportspeople from Cambridge
1955 births
2020 deaths